Gärten der Welt ("Gardens of the World") is a public park in Marzahn, Berlin. It was opened on 9 May 1987 as Berliner Gartenschau and was renamed Erholungspark Marzahn in 1991, before adopting its current name in 2017.

History

Overview
In 1991, the park was renamed to Erholungspark Marzahn. In October 2000, the Chinese garden is opened as a part of Gärten der Welt (Gardens of the World). This was followed by other gardens, including Oriental, Italian, Balinese, Korean, and Japanese. In 1995, it welcomed 132,000 visitors. By 2007 the number has increased to 650,000. The park was renamed to "Gärten der Welt" in 2017.
 
In 2018 the English garden was open in the park.

IGA 2017

The park was chosen as the site of the Internationale Gartenausstellung 2017 (IGA 2017), an international horticultural exhibition.

Pura Tri Hita Karana

Pura Tri Hita Karana is a functioning Hindu temple located in the Balinese Garden of the park. It is one of the few Hindu temples of Balinese architecture built outside Indonesia.

Gärten der Welt

Transport
Nearest metro station is Kienberg (Gärten der Welt), on the U5 line. Named "Neue Grottkauer Straße" until 2016, it was renamed in that way for the IGA 2017. The station is also the eastern terminus of the IGA Cable Car, a  aerial tramway line serving and crossing the park, built for the expo.

References

External links 

 
  International Gartenausstellung 2017 - the international gardening exhibition that held in 2017 in Erholungspark Marzahn

Parks in Berlin
Tourist attractions in Berlin
Urban public parks
Marzahn-Hellersdorf
Hindu temples in Germany
Balinese temples